Stevie Scott is a rugby union coach and former player who gained 11 caps with Scotland from 2000 to 2004. He played as hooker at Edinburgh and Border Reivers. He coached at Selkirk and Sale Sharks. He was assistant coach at Scotland and forward coach at Edinburgh Rugby.

Early life
Born 26 July 1974 in Galashiels, Scotland. He attended Henninger High School.

Club rugby

Scott played club rugby for Melrose and Kelso. He played 99 matches for Edinburgh. In March 2006 he extended his contract to play with Border Reivers.

International career
Scott made his debut for Scotland as a replacement against New Zealand at Auckland on 1 July 2000. His last cap came on the 2004 tour of Oceania.

Coaching career
Scott's first coaching role was in 2006 at Selkirk.  Then for three years he worked with the SRU’s Academy at Murrayfield. He joined Sale as coach in December 2010. In September 2012 years he was dismissed. In January 2013 he became a coaching assistant for the Scotland national team.

In March 2013 he became an interim head coach with Edinburgh, along with Duncan Hodge. This led to him being given the position of forwards coach. In April 2016, his contract was extended for two years. In May 2017, Edinburgh announced that he was leaving the club.

In December 2018, Scott was announced as the forwards coach for the Utah Warriors rugby union team in the USA's Major League Rugby.

References

External links
 profile at Edinburgh Rugby
 profile at Scottish Rugby

1974 births
Living people
Rugby union hookers
Rugby union players from Galashiels
Scottish rugby union players
Scottish rugby union coaches
People educated at Earlston High School
Scotland international rugby union players